The Museum of Edinburgh, formerly known as Huntly House Museum, is a museum in Edinburgh, Scotland, housing a collection relating to the town's origins, history and legends. Exhibits include an original copy of the National Covenant signed at Greyfriars Kirk in 1638 and a reconstruction of Field Marshal Earl Haig's headquarters on the Western Front during the Great War, the latter exhibiting items bequeathed to the Museum.

Situated in the late 16th-century Huntly House on the Canongate, the museum is maintained by the City of Edinburgh Council.

The Museum also houses spectacular collections of decorative art which reveal a rich history of Scottish craftsmanship, from beautifully cut and engraved glass and intricately made silver from Edinburgh and Canongate, costume, longcase clocks, along with Scottish pottery and Scottish porcelain dating from the 1760s.

See also 
 Edinburgh Museums, libraries and galleries

References

External links 
 Official website

Museums in Edinburgh
Edinburgh
Royal Mile
Local museums in Scotland
Category A listed buildings in Edinburgh
Listed museum buildings in Scotland